Leopold von Ledebur (18 May 1876 – 22 August 1955) was a German stage and film actor.

Selected filmography

 Carmen (1918)
 The Serenyi (1918)
 Midnight (1918)
 The Foolish Heart (1919)
 The Golden Lie (1919)
 The Gambler (1919)
 The Japanese Woman (1919)
 The Loves of Käthe Keller (1919)
 State Attorney Jordan (1919)
 The Bodega of Los Cuerros (1919)
 All Souls (1919)
 Devoted Artists (1919)
 The Carousel of Life (1919)
 Only a Servant (1919)
 The Last Sun Son (1919)
 The Fairy of Saint Ménard (1919)
 The Enchanted Princess (1919)
 Die Spieler (1920)
 Christian Wahnschaffe (1920)
 In the Whirl of Life (1920)
 World by the Throat (1920)
 The Skull of Pharaoh's Daughter (1920)
 Waves of Life and Love (1921)
 The Adventure of Doctor Kircheisen (1921)
 Count Varenne's Lover (1921)
 The Maharaja's Favourite Wife (1921)
 The House on the Moon (1921)
 Hashish, the Paradise of Hell (1921)
 Alfred von Ingelheim's Dramatic Life (1921)
 The False Dimitri (1922)
 Prashna's Secret (1922)
 To the Ladies' Paradise (1922)
 Inge Larsen (1923)
 Tatjana (1923)
 Maciste and Prisoner 51 (1923)
 Felicitas Grolandin (1923)
 Irene of Gold (1923)
 The Great Unknown (1924)
 Guillotine (1924)
 Nanon (1924)
 Orient (1924)
 Slaves of Love (1924)
 Spring Awakening (1924)
 Dudu, a Human Destiny (1924)
 Playing with Destiny (1924)
 Love's Finale (1925)
 The Iron Bride (1925)
 Goetz von Berlichingen of the Iron Hand (1925)
 Bismarck (1925)
 Wallenstein (1925)
 In the Name of the Kaisers (1925)
 The Third Squadron (1926)
 The Eleven Schill Officers (1926)
 The Mill at Sanssouci (1926)
 Princess Trulala (1926)
 Women of Passion (1926)
 Lace (1926)
 The Circus of Life (1926)
 The Prince and the Dancer (1926)
 The Long Intermission (1927)
 A Serious Case (1927)
 The Curse of Vererbung (1927)
 Lützow's Wild Hunt (1927)
 The Convicted (1927)
 My Aunt, Your Aunt (1927)
 Serenissimus and the Last Virgin (1928)
 Eva in Silk (1928)
 Escape from Hell (1928)
 The Woman from Till 12 (1928)
 The Lady from Argentina (1928)
 Panic (1928)
 Luther (1928)
 High Treason (1929)
 From a Bachelor's Diary (1929)
 Ship in Distress (1929)
 The Lord of the Tax Office  (1929)
 Secret Police (1929)
 Youthful Indiscretion (1929)
 The Youths (1929)
 Sin and Morality (1929)
 The Customs Judge (1929)
 The Blonde Nightingale (1930)
 Achtung! – Auto-Diebe! (1930)
 The Man in the Dark (1930)
 Witnesses Wanted (1930)
 Dreyfus (1930)
 Sunday of Life (1931)
 Waves of Life and Love (1921)
 Shadows of the Underworld (1931)
 Frederica (1932)
 No Money Needed (1932)
 Secret Agent (1932)
 Distorting at the Resort (1932)
 Gretel Wins First Prize (1933)
 The Judas of Tyrol (1933)
 Music in the Blood (1934)
 The Higher Command (1935)
 The Old and the Young King (1935)
 Orders Are Orders (1936)
 Alarm in Peking (1937)
 Ball at the Metropol (1937)
 The Model Husband (1937)
 Don't Promise Me Anything (1937)
 The Roundabouts of Handsome Karl (1938)
 Nanon (1938)
 The Impossible Mister Pitt (1938)
 Napoleon Is to Blame for Everything (1938)
 You and I (1938)
 Target in the Clouds (1939)
 Robert Koch (1939)
 The Life and Loves of Tschaikovsky (1939)
 The Leghorn Hat (1939)
 Shoulder Arms (1939)
 Bismarck (1940)
 The Three Codonas (1940)
 Friedemann Bach (1941)
 Komödianten (1941)
 Riding for Germany (1941)
 The Great Love (1942)
 Der große König (1942)
 Münchhausen (1943)
 Johann (1943)
 Summer Nights (1944)
 The Noltenius Brothers (1945)
 Love '47 (1949)
 Don't Dream, Annette (1949)
 The Tiger Akbar (1951)

External links

1876 births
1955 deaths
German male film actors
German male silent film actors
German male stage actors
Male actors from Berlin
20th-century German male actors